The Forester (released September 20, 2013 in Oslo, Norway) is the eighth album by Susanna, also known as Susanna and the Magical Orchestra, this time as Susanna and Ensemble neoN, leased on the label SusannaSonata (SONATACD008).

Background 
The eighth album release by Susanna is a series of original songs, and here she prove herself as an original songwriter with a strong signature. All About Jazz critique John Kelman, in his review The Forester states:

Reception 

AllMusic awarded the album 4 stars, The Guardian reviewer John Fordham awarded the album 4 stars, and the reviewer Per Henrik Arnesen of Gaffa.no awarded the album dice 5.

Track listing

Musicians 
Susanna Karolina Wallumrød - Vocals, Grand Piano
Ida Kristine Zimmermann Olsen - Alto saxophone
Inga Byrkjeland - Cello
Kristine Tjøgersen - Clarinet & bass clarinet
Yumi Murakami - Flute & alto flute
Ane Marthe Sørlien Holen - Percussion
Solmund Nystabakk - Theorbo
Karin Hellqvist - Violin
Magnus Loddgard - Conductor

Credits 
Producerd by Deathprod & Susanna
Recorded & mixed by Jan Erik Kongshaug
Mixed with Helge Sten, Jan Martin Smørdal & Susanna
Mastered by Helge Sten
Sleeve by Kim Hiorthøy

Notes 
Recorded at Rainbow Studio in February 2012 Oslo, Norway 
Mixed at Rainbow Studio 
Mastered at Audio Virus Lab

References 

2013 albums
Susanna Wallumrød albums